Beach kabaddi at the 2012 Asian Beach Games was held from 19 June to 22 June 2012 in Haiyang, China.

Medalists

Medal table

Results

Men

Preliminary round

Group A

Group B

Knockout round

Semifinals

Gold medal match

Women

Preliminary round

Gold medal match

References
 Official website

2012 Asian Beach Games events
2012
Asian